What's Your Husband Doing? is a 1920 American silent comedy film directed by Lloyd Ingraham and written by R. Cecil Smith based upon the play of the same name by George V. Hobart. The film stars Douglas MacLean, Doris May, Walter Hiers, William Buckley, Norris Johnson, and Alice Claire Elliott. The film was released on January 25, 1920, by Paramount Pictures.

Plot
As described in a film magazine, Beatrice Ridley (May), a young wife who possesses a devoted husband, spends her leisure time dreaming up romances about her Robert (Buckley) in which he figures as a gay Lothario and she the much wronged wife. Her suspicions become aroused when Robert receives letters each morning from the Honeysuckle Inn, a roadhouse frequented by sportsmen. These letters Robert quickly conceals with no word of explanation offered. Beatrice suspects the involvement of another woman and consults with attorneys, Widgast and Pidgeon, with a view of obtaining relief. Both of these lawyers are young men with young wives who also suffer torments of jealousy. Mrs. Widgast and Mrs. Pidgeon are on the scent for any possible infidelities on the part of their husbands. All clues lead to the Honeysuckle Inn and when all the characters meet there, there is a general clearing up of complications and ill-founded suspicions.

Cast
Douglas MacLean as John P. Widgast
Doris May as Beatrice Ridley
Walter Hiers as Charley Pidgeon
William Buckley as Robert Ridley
Norris Johnson as Helen Widgast 
Alice Claire Elliott as Gwendolyn Pidgeon 
Alice Wilson as Sylvia Pennywise
Margaret Livingston as Madge Mitchell
J. P. Lockney as Tyrus Trotman

Survival status
What's Your Husband Doing? is presumed to be a lost film with only a single incomplete reel surviving at the Library of Congress.

References

External links 

 
 Film still at silenthollywood.com

1920 films
1920s English-language films
Silent American comedy films
1920 comedy films
Paramount Pictures films
Films directed by Lloyd Ingraham
American black-and-white films
Lost American films
American silent feature films
1920 lost films
Lost comedy films
1920s American films